Sandra Birgitte Toksvig  (born 3 May 1958) is a Danish-British writer, comedian and broadcaster on British radio, stage and television. She is also a political activist, having co-founded the Women's Equality Party in 2015. She has written plays, novels and books for children. In 1994, she came out as a lesbian.

Toksvig took over from Stephen Fry as host of the BBC television quiz show QI in 2016 (series 'N'), having been a guest a number of times and she spent ten years hosting The News Quiz on BBC Radio 4. From 2017 to 2020 she was co-presenter of The Great British Bake Off, alongside comedian Noel Fielding. In 2020, she stepped down and was replaced by Matt Lucas.

Toksvig was the president of the Women of the Year Lunch from 2015 to 2017.

Early life
Toksvig was born in Denmark. Her father, Claus Toksvig, was a Danish journalist, broadcaster, and foreign correspondent; as a result, Toksvig spent most of her youth outside Denmark, mostly in New York City. Her mother, Julie Anne Toksvig (née Brett), is British. She has an older brother, Nick, who is a journalist, and a younger sister, Jenifer, a librettist, who was born when Sandi was 12. When Sandi was 24, she was appointed Jenifer's legal guardian. In 1969, her father covered the landing of the first man on the moon from mission control; she was holding the hand of Neil Armstrong's secretary during the landing. While her father was based in London, she attended Tormead School, an independent girls' school near Guildford. Her first job, at the age of 18, was as a follow spot operator for the musical Jesus Christ Superstar.

She read law, archaeology and anthropology at Girton College, Cambridge, graduating with a first-class degree and receiving two prizes (The Raemakers and the Theresa Montefiore Awards) for outstanding achievement. One of her law supervisors was Lord Denning.

Career

Beginnings
Toksvig began her comedy career at Girton, where she wrote and performed in the first all-woman show at the Footlights. She was there at the same time as Stephen Fry, Hugh Laurie, Tony Slattery, and Emma Thompson, and wrote additional material for the Perrier award-winning Cambridge Footlights Revue. She was also a member of the Cambridge University Light Entertainment Society.

She started her television career on children's television, presenting No. 73 (1982–1986), the Sandwich Quiz, The Saturday Starship, Motormouth, Gilbert's Fridge, for Television South, and factual programmes such as Island Race and The Talking Show, produced by Open Media for Channel 4. In 2000, she appeared as a guest presenter on Time Team, at a dig in York (season 7 episode 13).

Comedy
In the comedy circuit, Toksvig performed at the first night of the Comedy Store in London, and was once part of their Players, an improvisational comedy team.

In television, she appeared as a panellist in comedy shows such as Call My Bluff (a regular as a team captain), Whose Line Is It Anyway?, Mock the Week, QI, and Have I Got News for You, where she appeared on the first episode in 1990. She was also the host of What the Dickens, a Sky Arts quiz show.

On radio, she is a familiar voice for BBC Radio 4 listeners, having appeared on I'm Sorry I Haven't a Clue, The Unbelievable Truth, and as the chair of The News Quiz, where she replaced Simon Hoggart in September 2006, but left in June 2015 in order to enter politics to champion women's rights. Her final show was first broadcast on 26 June 2015. She presented Radio 4's travel programme Excess Baggage until it was axed in 2012.

Drama and factual
In 1993, Toksvig wrote a musical, Big Night Out at the Little Sands Picture Palace, for Nottingham Playhouse, co-starring with Anita Dobson and Una Stubbs. In 2002, it was re-written, with Dilly Keane, for the Watford Palace Theatre, in which they appeared with Bonnie Langford. Toksvig and Elly Brewer wrote a Shakespeare deconstruction, The Pocket Dream, which Toksvig performed at the Nottingham Playhouse and which transferred to the West End for a short run. The pair also wrote the 1992 TV series The Big One, in which she also starred. She has appeared in a number of stage plays, including Androcles and the Lion, Much Ado About Nothing, and The Comedy of Errors.

In 1996, she narrated the Dragons! interactive CD-ROM published by Oxford University Press and developed by Inner Workings, along with Harry Enfield. The software was primarily aimed at children and featured songs and poems about dragons. She also narrated the Winnie the Witch CD-ROM. She appeared in the Doctor Who audio drama Red by Big Finish Productions, released in August 2006. In December 2006, she hosted and sang at the London Gay Men's Chorus sold-out Christmas show, Make the Yuletide Gay, at the Barbican Centre. Over Christmas and New Year 2007/2008, she narrated the pantomime Cinderella at the Old Vic Theatre. In October 2011, she narrated the new musical Soho Cinders at the Queen's Theatre, London. In 2011 she hosted a second season of BBC Two's Antiques Master.

Toksvig wrote a play entitled Bully Boy which focused on post-traumatic stress among British servicemen. The play premièred at the Nuffield Theatre in Southampton in May 2011, and starred Anthony Andrews. The play then launched the debut season of St James Theatre in September 2012, the first new West End theatre to open in 30 years.

In the 2013 Christmas Special of BBC's Call the Midwife, Toksvig made a cameo appearance as grumpy ward nurse Sister Gibbs.

On 28 April 2015, it was announced that Toksvig would leave BBC Radio 4's The News Quiz in June at the end of the 28th series, which was scheduled to begin on 15 May of that year. She said: "I have decided it is time to move on and, of course, I feel sad but I think it's the right moment. The show is in great shape and, like a good house guest, you should always depart when people still wish you'd stay a bit longer." The BBC said Toksvig had made the "difficult decision" to leave in order "to embark on a new and exciting stage of her career". On 30 April 2015, Toksvig announced that her decision to quit The News Quiz had been made in order to allow her to help set up a new political party named the Women's Equality Party.

In November 2015, Toksvig was a guest of BBC Radio 4's Desert Island Discs. Her choices included Joe Nichols ("What's a Guy Gotta Do"), Gustav Winckler, The Weather Girls, Barbra Streisand, and Bonnie Langford. Her book choice was The Ashley Book of Knots, and her luxury item was an endless supply of the Daily Mail.

Her most recent play Silver Lining opened at the Rose Theatre Kingston on 11 February 2017, before touring to Portsmouth, Oxford, Cambridge, Ipswich, Keswick, York, and Salford. It centres around five elderly ladies and a young carer in a retirement home which is about to be flooded by a storm. It stars Rachel Davies, Keziah Joseph, Maggie McCarthy, Joanna Monro, Sheila Reid, and Amanda Walker. Toksvig's son, Theo Toksvig-Stewart, made his professional stage debut in the play.

On 11 June 2019, Toksvig appeared on former Prime Minister of Australia Julia Gillard's podcast. Notably, Toksvig states "Wikipedia is a marvelous idea and the idea is that it is a crowd sourced encyclopedia of knowledge, what a fantastic notion. But what's happening is that women are disappearing so 90% of Wikipedia's content is about men and their achievements and 9% is about women. 1% are still making up their mind. So that proportion is completely out of kilter and we desperately need to do something about it. Part of the problem is that it is edited by volunteers but there are about 350,000 "uber" volunteers that tend, no offence to them, to be the same kind of guy who has the time to sit and do it and doesn't have laundry to do and are actively editing women out. There are two issues: 1) women's achievements are not being inputted and 2) women are actively being edited out... I am intent on trying to change this if we can."

During the COVID-19 lockdown period in 2020, Toksvig created and performed "Vox Tox", a YouTube mini-series, from her home. These 10-minute sessions promoted the activities of women across the ages, being inspired by items from Toksvig's own library of books and biographies.

Writing
Toksvig has written more than twenty fiction and non-fiction books for children and adults, starting in 1994 with Tales from the Norse's Mouth, a fiction tale for children. In 1995, she sailed around the coast of Britain with John McCarthy, who had been held hostage in Beirut. In 2003, she published Gladys Reunited: A Personal American Journey, about her travels in the USA retracing her childhood. She writes regular columns for Good Housekeeping, the Sunday Telegraph and The Lady. In October 2008, she published Girls Are Best, a history book for girls.

In 2009, her collected columns for The Sunday Telegraph were published in book form as The Chain of Curiosity. In 2012, she published her book, Valentine Grey, an historical novel set in the Boer War. Her 2006 young adult book, Hitler's Canary is a Holocaust story told by a boy named Bamse and his family. The characters are based on Toksvig's own father and grandmother; the family heroism in the story closely resembles the author's father's own experiences during the war. Her memoir Between the Stops: The View of My Life from the Top of the Number 12 Bus was published on 29 October 2019.

In 2020, Toksvig wrote and presented a podcast series called We Will Get Past This which aimed to provide "virtual chicken soup for the soul" during the COVID-19 lockdown in the UK, by sharing stories of notable women from her book collection.

Television presenter
In 2012–13 Toksvig presented 1001 Things You Should Know for Channel 4 daytime. Toksvig began presenting the revival edition of the daytime game show Fifteen-to-One in April 2014. It is an hour-long instead of the original half-hour edition presented by William G. Stewart. After two series had been broadcast, in June 2015, Channel 4 announced that a further eight series would be made, hosted by Toksvig until the revived series ended on 28 June 2019.

Toksvig took over from Stephen Fry as host of QI, making her "the first female presenter of a British mainstream TV comedy panel show", a fact she found extraordinary in 2016. Her first appearance as host (or Bantermeister) was the first episode of the show's series "N", which was broadcast on 21 October 2016.

On 16 March 2017 she was announced as the new co-presenter of The Great British Bake Off on Channel 4, alongside Noel Fielding. They replaced the previous hosts, Sue Perkins and Mel Giedroyc. In January 2020, she announced she was leaving the show to focus on other work commitments, and was replaced by Matt Lucas.

Toksvig presented Channel 4's four-part travel series Extraordinary Escapes with Sandi Toksvig, which premiered on 10 February 2021. In December 2021, Channel 4 renewed the series for a second series, which premiered on 17 February 2022.

Politics and activism
Toksvig first came to wider public prominence in 1994 because the charity Save the Children dropped her services as compere of its 75th anniversary celebrations after she came out. The decision led to a direct action protest by the Lesbian Avengers, and the charity apologised.

Toksvig supports the charity and pressure group Liberty, hosting its 2012 awards ceremony. She was appointed president of the Women of the Year Lunch. An atheist and humanist, Toksvig is a patron of Humanists UK.

In October 2012, as the scale of the Jimmy Savile sexual abuse scandal became apparent, and amid claims that during the 1960s, 1970s, and 1980s, there was a culture within the BBC which tolerated sexual harassment, Toksvig stated that she was groped by a "famous individual" on air in the 1980s. Toksvig said the allegations of inappropriate behaviour at the BBC "did not surprise me at all". In September 2018, as the BBC gender pay gap controversy continued to unfold, Toksvig reported that she was only paid 40% of what Fry, her predecessor, had received. Toksvig had earlier told the Radio Times it would be "absurd" if she did not receive the same salary as him for chairing QI.

In 2003, she stood as a candidate in the election for the Chancellorship of the University of Oxford, supporting a campaign against student fees. She was defeated in the first round of voting, achieving 1,179 first-place votes out of about 8,000 cast. The election was won by Chris Patten. Almost a decade later she succeeded Sheila Hancock as Chancellor of the University of Portsmouth.

Toksvig's party-political sympathies have developed over the years. She was part of Red Wedge's comedy tour in the 1980s, which supported the Labour Party. By the 2004 elections, she was a high-profile celebrity supporter of the Liberal Democrats. She has received some criticism for joking about the Tories in 2011 (they've "put the 'N' into cuts" to child benefit), but has said Prime Minister Theresa May is "a good person". She has also joked about UKIP leader Nigel Farage. In 2012, she said in an interview that "I don't think there's a party that represents anything I believe in".

In 2023 Toksvig stated the reluctance of the Church of England to accept same sex marriage was harming gay people.  Toksvig stated "The problem is there is only one side that is impinging on the lives of others. And I'm afraid the very conservative people who interpret the Bible with less love than I would hope are causing severe mental health problems for the LGBTQ+ community.  My wife works in mental health with the queer community and the figures are shocking for a young LGBT person committing suicide, or attempting suicide, not because they feel bad about who they are, but because of the way society stigmatises them. So it's not an equal battle that we're having here."  Toksvig is campaigning to end 26 Church of England bishops sitting in the House of Lords.

Women's Equality Party
In April 2015, Toksvig chaired the first, informal, conference of a new political party, the Women's Equality Party, and then left her job as presenter of The News Quiz to formally co-found it. She later explained that she had decided that it was "not too late to fight the good fight, after all". In September the same year, she announced the dates for a comedy tour to raise funds for the party. The party's full set of policies was launched at Conway Hall, 20 October 2015.

Personal life

Toksvig is the mother of two daughters and a son, born in 1988, 1990 and 1994 respectively. The children were carried by her partner, Peta Stewart, from whom she separated in 1997, and were conceived through artificial insemination by donor Christopher Lloyd-Pack, younger brother of the actor Roger Lloyd-Pack.

It was having three young children that made her decide to come out, because, to the best of her knowledge, there were no out lesbians in British public life, and she did not want her children to grow up ashamed of having two mothers. Toksvig was warned she might never work again, and the family faced death threats and had to go into hiding.

She lives on a houseboat in Wandsworth with psychotherapist Debbie Toksvig, whom she joined in a civil partnership in 2007. They renewed their vows on 29 March 2014, the day same-sex marriage was introduced in England and Wales, and in December 2014, their civil partnership was converted into a marriage.

Toksvig became a British citizen in 2013. She describes her "posh" accent as being the result of a deliberate attempt to copy the voice of Celia Johnson in Brief Encounter, after being ostracised at boarding school for having an American accent.

In her late 50s, she lost a significant amount of weight on medical advice and credits this with giving her the confidence to go back to television.

In late 2022, Toksvig was hospitalised in Australia with bronchial pneumonia and was forced to cancel her upcoming New Zealand tour dates. On 6 December 2022 she announced that she had left hospital but was still not well enough to travel. On 15 December, it was reported that she had returned to the UK.

Honours and awards
1997 – The Grand Order of Water Rats Show Business Personality of the Year
2007 – Political Humourist of the Year at the Channel 4 Political Awards and 2007 – Radio Broadcaster of the Year by the Broadcasting Press Guild
2007 – Read it or Else Award from Coventry Inspiration Book Awards for Hitler's Canary
2008 – Broadcaster of the Year at the Stonewall Awards
2009 – Voice of the Listener & Viewer Award for Individual Contribution to Radio
2013 – Voice of the Listener & Viewer Award for Excellence in Broadcasting (Roberts Radio Special Award)
2017 – CoScan (Confederation of Scandinavian Societies) International Award

National honours

Decorations and medals

Scholastic
 University degrees

 Chancellor, visitor, governor, rector and fellowships

Honorary degrees

Bibliography

Books for adults

Books for children

References

External links

Sandi Toksvig at the British Film Institute
Sandi Toksvig (Aveleyman)

1958 births
Living people
Alumni of Girton College, Cambridge
British humanists
British atheists
British radio personalities
British television presenters
British women comedians
British women in politics
Danish emigrants to England
Danish humanists
Danish atheists
LGBT producers
English lesbian actresses
English lesbian writers
Danish lesbian writers
Danish lesbian actresses
English LGBT broadcasters
English LGBT comedians
Danish LGBT comedians
Lesbian comedians
Naturalised citizens of the United Kingdom
Officers of the Order of the British Empire
People educated at Tormead School
Actresses from Copenhagen
Political party founders
Danish people of British descent
Women's Equality Party people
Politicians from London
QI
People associated with the University of Portsmouth
British women television presenters
Fellows of Girton College, Cambridge
Fellows of Lucy Cavendish College, Cambridge
Honorary Fellows of Newnham College, Cambridge
People associated with York St John University
People associated with the University of Surrey
People associated with the University of Westminster
20th-century English LGBT people
21st-century English LGBT people
20th-century Danish LGBT people
21st-century Danish LGBT people